Aston Llewellyn Moore  (born 8 February 1956) is a male Jamaican-born former track and field athlete who competed for Great Britain, specializing in the triple jump event.

He is currently an athletics coach, based in Birmingham, West Midlands. He is a member of the National Coaching Federation and is employed as national event coach for the triple jump by UK Athletics.

Biography
Moore competed at the 1976 Montreal Olympics but failed to progress past the qualifying rounds. He won a bronze medal at the Commonwealth Games on two occasions; first in 1978 with a jump of 16.69 metres, then in 1982 with a wind-assisted 16.76 m. He also represented England, at the 1986 Commonwealth Games in Edinburgh, Scotland.

He also won a bronze medal with a jump of 16.73 m at the 1981 European Indoor Championships, finishing third behind Shamil Abbyasov and Klaus Kübler. In addition, over the course of his career he won three AAA championships in triple jump.

After his retirement from athletics Moore focused on coaching triple jump to younger generations. He has helped train Ashia Hansen, current UK and former world record holder for indoor triple jump, and Phillips Idowu, an Olympic silver medallist. His son Jonathan Moore won the gold medal for triple jump at the 2001 World Youth Championships.

Moore was appointed Member of the Order of the British Empire (MBE) in the 2023 New Year Honours for services to athletics.

References

External links
 Profile at British Olympic Association website

1956 births
Living people
English male triple jumpers
British male triple jumpers
Jamaican emigrants to the United Kingdom
English athletics coaches
Olympic athletes of Great Britain
Athletes (track and field) at the 1976 Summer Olympics
Commonwealth Games medallists in athletics
Commonwealth Games bronze medallists for England
Athletes (track and field) at the 1978 Commonwealth Games
Athletes (track and field) at the 1982 Commonwealth Games
People from Spanish Town
Members of the Order of the British Empire
Medallists at the 1978 Commonwealth Games
Medallists at the 1982 Commonwealth Games